The 2006 Rolex Sports Car Series season was the seventh season of the Grand-Am Rolex Sports Car Series presented by Crown Royal Special Reserve.  The 15-race championship was competed with Daytona Prototype (DP) and Grand Touring (GT) class cars.  It began January 28, 2006 and ended September 2, 2006. Infineon Raceway was added, breaking the record for most races. Mont Tremblant was dropped for Miller Motorsports Park, leaving Hermanos Rodríguez as the only race outside the US. Long Beach Street Circuit was added.

Schedule

 1: Only the DP class participated in this event, no GT class.
 2: Only the GT class participated in this event, no DP class.

Season results

Championship standings

Source:

Daytona Prototypes

Drivers (Top 20)

Grand Touring

Drivers (Top 10)

References

External links
 The official website of Grand-Am

Rolex Sports Car Series
Rolex Sports Car Series